Panikhia Jati also known as Panichhuan Jati  (Clean castes) of Odisha. Which is a group of dominant and high rank castes. Which water and foods are acceptable for deities and also for Brahmins, includes: Karan,
Khandayat, Gopal, Chasa and Gudia caste. There is good social relation and  communication among them. They are very strict for their social status or prestige, they do not take water and foods from lower communities. But occasionally they are allowing Barika and Mali peoples to participate in their festivals and other ritual works.

Reference

Indian castes
Social groups of Odisha